Tsarychanka is an urban-type settlement in Dnipro Raion, Dnipropetrovsk Oblast in Ukraine. It hosts the administration of Tsarychanka settlement hromada, one of the hromadas of Ukraine. Population: 

Tsarychanka is located in the north of the Oblast, on the right bank of the Oril, a left tributary of the Dnieper.

History
In the 19th century Tsarychanka was the administrative center of Tsarychanka volost, Kobelyaksky Uyezd, Poltava Governorate.

Until 18 July 2020, Tsarychanka was the administrative center of Tsarychanka Raion. The raion was abolished in July 2020 as part of the administrative reform of Ukraine, which reduced the number of raions of Dnipropetrovsk Oblast to seven. The area of Tsarychanka Raion was merged into Dnipro Raion.

Economy

Transportation
Tsarychanka is situated on a road connecting Dnipro and Kobeliaky, where it has access to another road connecting Poltava and Kremenchuk. In Tsarychanka, a road branches off east to Mahdalynivka and Hubynykha.

References

Urban-type settlements in Dnipro Raion
Kobelyaksky Uyezd